Shaun Joseph Gerardo (born September 22, 1984) is an American film, stage and television actor. He made his major feature film debut in X-Men: First Class. Gerardo also made his first voice role debut in the 2013 animated film Alpha and Omega 2: A Howl-iday Adventure. He reprised his Rogue Wolf role in the 2016 film, Alpha and Omega 7: The Big Fureeze, distributed by Lionsgate. He is of Italian descent and a former semi-pro basketball player.

Stage Work
Shaun hit the stage early in life. At the age of twelve he played Gilligan in Gilligan's Island. At the age of 22, he wrote, directed and starred in a play titled The Vision of a Woman. This play was put on by the Scottsdale Center for the Arts, and it received heavy praise for its ability to bring social issues regarding women to the forefront. In 2011, Patch Media reviewed Shaun's work in One Night Stands, a play by Paul Storiale: "Shaun Gerardo, holds his own and shows vulnerability, strength, sincerity and realism few Oscar-winning actors display".

References

External links
 

1984 births
Living people
American male stage actors
American male film actors
American male television actors